Perrine Marie Pelen (born 3 July 1960) is a former World Cup alpine ski racer from France.  Born at Boulogne-Billancourt near Paris, she made her World Cup debut at age 16 in December 1976 and won three slalom races that 

Pelen won the bronze medal at the 1980 Winter Olympics in giant slalom; in 1984, she won the silver medal in slalom and another bronze in giant slalom. At the World Championships, she won the silver medal in combined in 1982 and the gold in slalom in 1985.

Pelen won fifteen World Cup races and the season title in the slalom in the 1980. She was runner-up in the slalom standings in 1977 and 1978, and took third in 1981, 1984, 1985, and 1986.

After ten seasons on the World Cup circuit, Pelen retired from competition following the 1986 season.

World Cup results

Season titles

Season standings

Individual races
 15 wins – (15 SL)
 43 podiums – (7 GS, 36 SL)

World Championship results 

From 1948 through 1980, the Winter Olympics were also the World Championships for alpine skiing.
At the World Championships from 1954 through 1980, the combined was a "paper race" using the results of the three events (DH, GS, SL).

Olympic results

References

External links
 
 Perrine Pelen World Cup standings at the International Ski Federation 
 
 
 

1960 births
Living people
Sportspeople from Boulogne-Billancourt
French female alpine skiers
Alpine skiers at the 1980 Winter Olympics
Alpine skiers at the 1984 Winter Olympics
Olympic alpine skiers of France
Olympic silver medalists for France
Olympic bronze medalists for France
Olympic medalists in alpine skiing
FIS Alpine Ski World Cup champions
Medalists at the 1984 Winter Olympics
Medalists at the 1980 Winter Olympics
Universiade medalists in alpine skiing
Universiade gold medalists for France
Competitors at the 1981 Winter Universiade